Dog Poison is the ninth studio album by the American garage rock band Thee Oh Sees, released in 2009 on Captured Tracks. It is the band's third release under the name Thee Oh Sees.

Track listing

Personnel
All personnel credits adapted from the album's liner notes
 John Dwyer - writer, performer
 Paul Wackers - cover art
 Eric Landmark - master

References

2009 albums
Oh Sees albums
Captured Tracks albums